Tioroniaradougou (often shortened to Tioro) is a town in northern Ivory Coast. It is a sub-prefecture and commune of Korhogo Department in Poro Region, Savanes District.

In 2014, the population of the sub-prefecture of Tioroniaradougou was 15,485.

Villages
The 27 villages of the sub-prefecture of Tioroniaradougou and their population in 2014 are:

Notes

Sub-prefectures of Poro Region
Communes of Poro Region